The 1893 Massachusetts Aggies football team represented Massachusetts Agricultural College in the 1893 college football season. The team played its home games at Alumni Field in Amherst, Massachusetts. Massachusetts finished the season with a record of 1–9.

Schedule

References

Massachusetts
UMass Minutemen football seasons
Massachusetts Aggies football